Waltham North station is a former railroad station in Waltham, Massachusetts. Originally built by the Central Massachusetts Railroad, it was part of the MBTA Commuter Rail system from 1965 to 1971. It was located on Lexington Street in north-central Waltham. It was closed on November 26, 1971, when service on the Central Mass Branch was terminated due to poor track conditions and low ridership. The station building is no longer extant, having been demolished at some point after the end of service on the branch.

References

1881 establishments in Massachusetts
1971 disestablishments in Massachusetts
Former MBTA stations in Massachusetts
MBTA Commuter Rail stations in Middlesex County, Massachusetts
Railway stations in the United States opened in 1881
Railway stations closed in 1971
Waltham, Massachusetts